The Copland Pass (el. ) is an alpine pass in the Southern Alps of New Zealand. Known as Noti Hinetamatea by the indigenous Ngāi Tahu, the pass follows the route of the Makaawhio ancestor Hinetamatea and her sons Tātāwhākā and Marupeka.

The Copland Pass is located on the Main Divide and is thus located on the boundary of Aoraki / Mount Cook and Westland Tai Poutini National Parks.

The Copland River on the western side of the Main Divide may have been named by the surveyor J. G. Roberts for Dr James Copland, an early settler in Otago. A month later, the mountaineer Arthur Paul Harper was the first non-Māori man to cross the slightly higher Copland Pass and he named it for the main river draining its western side. Jane Thomson was the first non-Māori woman to cross the pass in 1903.

Since the mid-1990s, the eastern climb towards the pass has experienced heavy erosion, and the Copland Pass has become extremely difficult to climb. The Department of Conservation advises that only parties with a "high level of mountaineering experience and appropriate mountaineering equipment" should attempt the crossing, and that numerous fatalities have occurred over the years. Furthermore, crossings should only be attempted from east to west. The Hooker Hut on the eastern side of the pass, which was on the traditional route for the crossing, is no longer accessible, but is stranded on an eroding moraine.

Climate
The climate of Copland Pass is considered as a tundra climate (ET under the Köppen-Geiger climate classification), due to its high altitude.
The average high temperature in February is 13.5 °C (56.3 °F), while the average low temperature in July is -11.8 °C (10.8 °F). Most days in winter often fail to get above freezing point, and the average overnight summer temperatures are slightly below 0 °C (32 °F). Due to the high altitude of Copland Pass, warmth from daylight hours can rapidly dissipate, contributing to the diurnal temperature variation. The average annual temperature at Copland Shelter is 0.3 °C (32.5 °F).

References

Mountain passes of the Southern Alps
Westland Tai Poutini National Park
Aoraki / Mount Cook National Park
Geography of Canterbury, New Zealand
Geography of the West Coast, New Zealand